A Shipyard transporter is a heavy equipment transporter or heavy trailer and is often used in shipyards but is not limited to them. As its name implies, a shipyard transporter is often used in transporting ship sections from the shipbuilder workshop to the dock to assemble a whole vessel.

Shipyard transporters adopt hydraulic suspension and steering to achieve loading, moving and steering. As each wheel has an independent steering unit, the shipyard transporter can achieve 8 direction moving and turning 360 degrees around the middle point of the transporter as the origin point.

Some times, Self Propelled Modular Transporters (SPMT) or self-propelled trailers are also called shipyard transporters.

References

Shipbuilding